The South Sudan national basketball team is the national basketball team representing South Sudan. Its official name is South Sudan Basketball Federation. It was established in May 2011, and became a member of FIBA in December 2013. They are nicknamed the Bright Stars.

The most recently founded national basketball team in FIBA, South Sudan has already played at one AfroBasket tournament in 2021 and has qualified for the 2023 FIBA Basketball World Cup.

History
The team played its first unofficial match in Juba against Ugandan club champions Power on 13th July 2011, in Juba. Power won the match 86–84.

In 2016, the team played in a exhibition tournament named Idigenous Basketball Competition in Vancouver, Canada.

On 9th January 2016, it was announced by the South Sudan Basketball Federation that Jerry Steele would become the new head coach of the men's national team for preparation of the 2017 AfroBasket competition. Through the agreement Steele would be under contract until the 2020 Tokyo Olympics.

In the 2017 AfroBasket qualifiers, the team was placed in Zone 5 Group A, with Egypt, Kenya, Rwanda. South Sudan played its first official international game on March 12, 2017, against Egyptian Cairo. They would lose to Egypt by 11 points (87–76) in the first match on 12 March. Two days later the national team got it first victory in group stage against Kenya by 2 (68–66). The next day, the team relieved its next loss by ten (80–90) to Rwanda, later placing them in the Classification game. On 12 March, the team would beat Kenya in the Classification game in OT (84–89).

Coach Steele and the South Sudan Basketball Federation parted ways by mutual agreement on 3rd October 2017.

On 7 November 2017, Scott Catt was appointed to be the new head coach of the men's national team by the South Sudan Basketball Federation. Madut Bol, son of the late Manute Bol, was also named as assistant head coach of the men's national team.

In November 2020, former NBA All-Star Luol Deng became the president of the SSBF. He also shortly coached the team. In September 2021, Royal Ivey, assistant coach with the Brooklyn Nets, became the head coach of the team. In the round of 16, South Sudan beat , in the quarterfinals the team lost to defending champions .

In the following 2023 FIBA Basketball World Cup qualification games, the Bright Stars impressed and had an unbeaten record in the first round (6-0), beating the defending African champions Tunisia twice and qualifying for their first World Cup in the third round with two games left. In the second round, again coached by Luol Deng, they had another successful streak in order to qualify for South Sudan's first-ever World Cup in 2023.

Competitive record

FIBA World Cup

FIBA AfroBasket

Current roster
Roster as of February 26, 2023.

Head coaches 
The following is a list of all head coaches of South Sudan:

References

External links

FIBA profile
South Sudanese Men National Team 2017 at Afrobasket.com

Men's national basketball teams
Basketball
National
2011 establishments in South Sudan